Robert Douglas Damron (born October 27, 1972) is an American professional golfer, who has played on the PGA Tour. He is a studio analyst for the Golf Channel.

Damron was born in Pikeville, Kentucky and raised there and later in Orlando, Florida after his father, a wealthy Kentucky coal magnate, moved the family to Bay Hill. Damron had the benefit of some early advice about golf from Bay Hill neighbor Arnold Palmer. He attended Orlando's Dr. Phillips High School graduating in 1990.

Damron later attended the University of Central Florida in Orlando from 1991 to 1994, where he was a distinguished member of the golf team, earning All-American honors three times. He won five collegiate events while at UCF. He turned pro in 1994, becoming the first UCF student to earn a full-time berth on the PGA Tour. Damron was inducted into the UCF Athletics Hall of Fame in 2002.

Damron has won one PGA Tour event, the 2001 Verizon Byron Nelson Classic. He finished in a three-way tie for first in the same tournament in 2004 (it was called the EDS Byron Nelson Championship that year), which he and Dudley Hart lost in a playoff to Sergio García. His best finish in a major is a T-20 at the 2003 U.S. Open. After turning 35, Damron played mostly on the Web.com Tour.

Damron's brother, Patrick, is also a professional golfer. He lives in Orlando.

Professional wins (2)

PGA Tour wins (1)

PGA Tour playoff record (1–1)

Nationwide Tour wins (1)

Nationwide Tour playoff record (1–0)

Results in major championships

Note: Damron never played in the Masters Tournament.

CUT = missed the half-way cut
"T" = tied

Results in The Players Championship

CUT = missed the halfway cut
"T" indicates a tie for a place

See also
1996 PGA Tour Qualifying School graduates

References

External links

American male golfers
UCF Knights men's golfers
PGA Tour golfers
Golfers from Kentucky
Golfers from Orlando, Florida
Dr. Phillips High School alumni
People from Pikeville, Kentucky
1972 births
Living people